The 5th constituency of the Nord is a French legislative constituency in the Nord département.

Description

Nord's 5th constituency lies in the centre of the department to the south of Lille. The main town is Seclin which is still part of the Métropole Européenne de Lille but this left leaning town is outweighed by the more conservative surrounding areas.

Despite 40 years of uninterrupted Socialist Party control between 1962 and 2002, the seat turned right in the 21st centuries, and was held by the conservative UMP or Republicans between 2002 and 2022, before being won by the far-right RN.

Historic representation

Election results

2022

 
 
 
 
 
 
 
|-
| colspan="8" bgcolor="#E9E9E9"|
|-

2017

2012

 
 
 
 
|-
| colspan="8" bgcolor="#E9E9E9"|
|-

2007

 
 
 
 
 
 
 
|-
| colspan="8" bgcolor="#E9E9E9"|
|-

2002

 
 
 
 
 
 
 
 
|-
| colspan="8" bgcolor="#E9E9E9"|
|-

1997

 
 
 
 
 
 
|-
| colspan="8" bgcolor="#E9E9E9"|
|-

Sources
 Official results of French elections from 1998: 

5